The 1929–30 Northern Football League season was the 37th in the history of the Northern Football League, a football competition in Northern England.

Clubs

The league featured 12 clubs which competed in the last season, along with two new clubs:
 Crook Town
 Eden Colliery Welfare

League table

References

1929-30
4